Erik Cadée (born 15 February 1984) is a Dutch discus thrower.

Cadée was born in 's-Hertogenbosch.  Among his first international appearances was a runner-up performance at the 2001 European Youth Olympic Festival. He competed in the qualifying rounds of the 2002 World Junior Championships in Athletics and improved the following year to claim the gold medal at the 2003 European Athletics Junior Championships. Cadée represented the Netherlands at the World Championships in Athletics in 2007 and 2009, but did not reach the final. He qualified for the final at the 2010 European Athletics Championships, but failed to record a legal throw in his three attempts.

He won the silver medal at the 2011 European Cup Winter Throwing meet in March, and set a then personal best and world leading throw the following month, throwing the discus to a mark of 66.95 m.  His present personal best is 67.30 m.

Achievements

References

1984 births
Living people
Dutch male discus throwers
Sportspeople from 's-Hertogenbosch
Athletes (track and field) at the 2012 Summer Olympics
Olympic athletes of the Netherlands
World Athletics Championships athletes for the Netherlands